New Technology High School at GHS was a public high school in Charlotte, North Carolina, United States. It was one of five small schools located on the Garinger campus of schools in Charlotte-Mecklenburg Schools.

History
New Technology High School at Garinger was established in 2006. Modeled after the New Technology High School in Napa, California, the school opened in 2006 with a class of 91 ninth graders and added a grade with each successive year. The school's first graduating class was the class of 2010.

New Technology High School at Garinger was the result of a joint vision by Charlotte-Mecklenburg Schools, The New Tech Network, the New Schools Project, and the Bill & Melinda Gates Foundation.

The school closed in 2013, with the five small schools becoming one large school again under the name Garinger High School.

Campus
New Technology High School shared the Garinger campus with four other new small schools: Math and Science High School, International Studies High School, Business and Finance High School, and Leadership and Public Services High School.

References

External links
 New Technology High School @ GHS's CMS website

Schools in Charlotte, North Carolina
Educational institutions established in 2006
Defunct schools in North Carolina
2006 establishments in North Carolina